Insight Partners (previously Insight Venture Partners) is an American venture capital and private equity firm based in New York City. The firm invests in growth-stage technology, software and Internet businesses.

History

Insight Partners was founded in 1995 by Jeff Horing and Jerry Murdock. Insight Partners raised more than $90 billion in capital commitments, including $20 billion in its Fund XII in 2021. In March 2019, Insight Venture Partners changed its name to Insight Partners. In October 2019, the firm established an office in Tel Aviv. In 2020, Insight Partners joined Diligent Corporation's initiative and pledged to create five new board roles among its portfolio companies for racially diverse candidates.

In 2020, Insight Partners backed software startup JFrog's initial public offering (IPO), followed by 1stdibs' IPO in 2021. In April 2021, Insight Partners raised $1.56 billion for the Insight Partners Opportunities Fund I LP, a new fund outside of its flagship growth-investment vehicles. As of June 2021, Insight Partners is the biggest investor in Monday.com and WalkMe, owning a 43% stake in Monday.com and 32% of WalkMe, with a combined ownership worth $3.9 billion. Also in 2021, Insight Partners put up $500 million to take a minority stake in Saks.com. Insight Partners also put $15 million of its own capital into an additional new fund, called The Vision Capital 2020 LP Fund. The Vision 2020 LP Capital Fund backs minority led firms raising early-stage funds. In February 2022, Insight Partners announced it had raised $20 billion for its twelfth flagship fund, more than doubling the size of its previous flagship fund. In May 2022, as part of a $200 million funding round led by KKR, Insight Partners increased its previous investment in the cybersecurity company and speculated unicorn Semperis.

Insight Partners was on the Forbes Midas List, Forbes 30 Under 30: Venture Capital and the Private Equity International Awards: PEI 300. In 2017, Business Insider ranked Insight Partners #7 on the outlet's list of most prominent venture capital investors in Europe.

See also 

 Kaseya
 Academic Partnerships

References

External links
Company Web Site

Private equity firms of the United States
Venture capital firms of the United States
Privately held companies based in New York (state)
Companies based in New York City
Financial services companies established in 1995